The 1986–87 Scottish First Division season was won by Morton, who were promoted along with Dunfermline Athletic to  the Premier Division. Brechin City and Montrose were relegated to the Second Division.

Table

References

1986-1987
2
Scot